Dairoku (written: 大麓 or 大六) is a masculine Japanese given name. Notable people with the name include:

 (1917–1985), Japanese archaeologist
 (1855–1917), Japanese mathematician and educator

Japanese masculine given names